Orrock can refer to:
 Orrock Township, Minnesota

Surname
 Bobby Orrock, politician
 Bryan Orrock, Australian rugby league footballer
 James Orrock, Scottish art collector
 Nan Grogan Orrock, politician
 Robert Orrock, Scottish international footballer
 Roy Orrock, British airman

Disambiguation pages with surname-holder lists